"Nxde" (pronounced "nude") is a song by South Korean girl group (G)I-dle. It was released through Cube Entertainment on October 17, 2022, as the lead single of the group's fifth extended play, I Love (2022). It was written, composed, and arranged by Soyeon with additional composition and arrangement credits by PopTime and Kakao. Musically, it is an alternative pop song that utilizes jazzy instrumentations while its lyrics revolve around the notion of expressing one's true self.

"Nxde" was met with generally positive reviews from critics, who praised its production and noted its themes of female empowerment, self-love, objectification and hypersexualization of women by the media and public. It was a commercial success in South Korea, topping the Circle Digital Chart, and became the group's second number-one single on the chart. The accompanying music video was directed by Son Seung-hee of High Quality Fish and takes heavy inspiration from Marilyn Monroe and Banksy. "Nxde" received airplay on KMVQ-FM, a radio station in San Francisco, within a day of its release, marking the first time a Korean-language song by a K-pop girl group debuted on an American radio station. It later charted at number forty on Billboard's Pop Airplay, making (G)I-dle the first act from an independent label to chart with a non-English song.

Background and release
On September 30, 2022, the group unveiled the artwork poster for the title song through the group's official SNS accounts and website, revealing "Nxde" as the lead single. The poster is a shot of the members' heads to shoulders, highlighting their individuality with different tones of blonde hair and red lips, raising the expectations for the new song. Simultaneously, the group released I Love sketch film that contains a preview of the EP which begins with the phrase 'How Do I Look?' in the black and white screen as (G)I-dle's photoshoot begins and proceeds to shots of the members' bodies as they slip off their clothes. In particular, it draws attention by foretelling a new challenge for the group with an unconventional and daring direction projecting the concept of power, confidence, freedom, and body autonomy.

Cube sent "Nxde" to San Francisco's radio airplay Now FM station on October 18, 2022. Station 99.7's Jazzy Jim Archer said, "As soon as I heard the music, I wanted to give it to the listeners quickly. It is probably the first time I have played a sound source other than English or Latin on the radio. They will do well in the conservative radio media and overcome that barrier." An official from the US record industry also said, "Nxde's radio debut is a historical event as it can be seen that language is not a barrier to K-pop's entry into the global market". The remix version by American DJ Steve Aoki was released on December 16.

Music and lyrics

Composition

"Nxde" was written, composed, and arranged by Soyeon with additional composition and arrangement handled by PopTime and Kako. The song is composed in the key of A minor with a tempo of 136 beats per minute. "Nxde" is described as an alternative pop work that samples an aria from Georges Bizet's 1875 opéra comique Carmen, "Habanera". It features a jazzy instrumentations with a grand bass line consisting of a shuffle rhythm and sarcastic lyrics on the provocative views on the word 'nude', accompanied by whispering vocalizations by the members. The song builds around dynamic piano soundscapes, high-pitched strings, and background percussion, and is characterized by its intentional disruptive musical cacophony. The beginning of the song contains lyrics with the phrase, 'yeppi yeppi', which is Korean slang based on the word meaning 'to be pretty' (yeppuda). A part of the song briefly references Lorelei Lee, a character Monroe played in Gentlemen Prefer Blondes (1953), as a philosophy-obsessed bookworm and self-made woman. The song deliberately uses the term 'Nxde' to tease 'bare' as true self rather than taking off any outer clothing – the song's last verse, 'I'm born nude/the lewd is you/Rude'.

Theme
On the "I Love" interview, released on October 14, (G)I-dle gave a glimpse of the comeback concept with a montage-style monochrome video. In the clip, the members spoke in their native languages (Korean, Thai, Standard Chinese, and Taiwanese Mandarin). Shriya Swami of HITC calls it "a very raw and heart-touching experience."

Critical reception
"Nxde" has received mostly positive critical reception, with most reviewers commenting on its theme of empowerment. Shriya Swami of HITC wrote: "In their empowering 'blonde' era, the girls are flawless with all the glitz and glamour as they deliver the statement of being more than just their looks." Writing for Genius, Sofia Gomez emphasizes that the album is to "fight misconceptions and stereotypes towards women" and "directly calls out individuals that look up the song for an objectionable" and "those that oversexualize women". The author also affirmed that "(G)I-dle has once again used their privilege as idols to bring awareness to the harm women endure from societal expectations." The Standard Pops Hathaitarn Chatlertmongkol opined that (G)I-dle attempts to break the framework of gender stereotypes further in "Nxde", terming it a "redefine "Tomboy" in its own right". Ahn Yu-jin of Star News commented that "What they want to say through nude not only represents their opinion but the mind of women and children. [...] Their steps are the path that popular art should take." The writer also pointed out the positive impact on the word 'nude' on domestic and foreign search portals akin to Park Chan-wook's film The Handmaiden (2016). BuzzFeed named it as one of the Best Career Comeback of 2022. Ranking it as number 88 in their list of the top 100 songs of 2022, Rolling Stone called the song's "lyrics and the video, "Nxde" addresses the objectification of women in a way that's rare for a K-pop girl group." When selecting "Nxde" as one of the 79 Best K-Pop Songs released 2022, Malvika Padinis of Teen Vogue said "Nxde" is a "clapback of epic proportions led by powerful lyricism and a seamless blend of infectious sonics and eye-catching aesthetics.", and praised all five members as they have "established themselves as an emblem of multiculturalism with their amalgamation of Chinese, Thai, and Korean culture, and continue to deliver unique artistry led by poignant messages and artistic concepts."

Commercial performance
"Nxde" was a commercial success in South Korea. Upon release, it topped all real-time charts in South Korea and achieved their second perfect all-kill (PAK) of 2022, making (G)I-dle the fourth group in K-pop history to have multiple PAKs within the same year, after 2NE1 (2011), Big Bang (2015) and Twice (2016). The song peaked at number one on the Circle Digital Chart, becoming the group's second number-one single.

In Singapore, the song debuted at number 15 on the RIAS Top Regional Chart in the chart issue dated October 14–20, 2022. The song debuted at number 21 on Billboard Taiwan Songs issue dated October 29, 2022 and at number 13 on the Billboard US World Digital Song Sales during the same week.

Music video
On October 15 and 16, music video teasers were released through the group's official social media, which was followed with the official music video's release the next day. The visual was directed by Son Seung-hee (Samsonii) of High Quality Fish production team while set design was led by art director Lee Jungae. Within 24 hours of its release, the video topped YouTube's trending page and surpassed 24 million views. By October 27, it received 74 million views on the platform.

A dance performance video for the song was released on October 23, 2022. The choreography was created by Moon Tae-eun, a member of South Korean boy band The Vish, and Kiel Tutin, who previously choreographed the group's previous single "Tomboy".

Synopsis and reception 

The video depicts the members as movie stars in "showgirl-inspired fashion" along with numerous references to "iconic" Marilyn Monroe moments. The music video opens with a poster welcoming viewers to a "wild, wicked and wonderful show" titled Nude. Then, a scene of Soyeon wearing flappers, on the piano singing, "Why you think (that) 'bout nude/'cause your view's so rude/Think outside the box/Then you'll like it." Then, a scene of Minnie wearing a pink dress followed by Yuqi wearing Chanel No. 5, which is known that Monroe wore that perfume before going to bed. In the dressing room, Soyeon is seen wearing a bullet bra and holding a book of Leaves of Grass, a collection of poems by Walt Whitman that Monroe once read and is known for its mysterious and esoteric works, and rips up a newspaper that has the writing of Monroe's life and public scrutiny. In the video, the group catches the eye of the public by becoming influencers of works whether as statues, or being displayed in a glass box. In another scene, Soyeon is seen live through her phone, and the screen is full of criticism that they are somewhat incompetent and disrespectful insults. An animated character, a reference to Jessica Rabbit, is shown who is poorly portrayed by the people because of her femme fatale image, contrary to her true self – Like her signature line 'I'm not bad. I'm just drawn that way.' The video then cuts to a scene of (G)I-dle's version painting that says 'nude' across a figure of a woman being destroyed at a museum, thus portraying a rebellion against social norms and the breaking of limits. The destruction of the painting referenced Banksy's Love is in the Bin piece, which infamously self-shredded upon being auctioned for $25 million. Towards the end of the video, it stated in bold red text on a black background that "Marilyn Monroe and Banksy inspire the video. Thank you, and love you".

Lee Hwa-yun from GQ stated in her article: "(G)I-dle ultimately goes to the message of 'I will wear the beautiful me', regardless of how the public sees them. The 'luxury nude' they draw is not the erotic work that the public expected, like Jessica Rabbit's shattered nude. It means to wear yourself as you are, even if you are not loved or look good. And, 'Think outside the box/then you’ll like it', [the group] boldly invite the public to a wider world." Some speculated that the character is the group's former member, Seo Soo-jin due to the visual similarity.  Sofia Gomez of Genius regarded that "the self-destruction became a performative spectacle that rejected the commercialization of art with its sole intent of humiliation. In connection to (G)I-dle's message, both the painting and music video criticize how as art, they're undermined and reduced to what society gains from them — taking away their worth and significance." And after the nude painting is shredded, they deliver the final verse, "You are the perverted one". DD of Rolling Stone India named "Nxde" as "(G)I-dle's rebellion as they boldly declare their intentions to challenge perspectives through their music, even if that results in a dip in public affection."

Costume design
Vogue Hong Kong noted that in the music video (G)I-dle wore 3 group costumes, and each member had at least two sets of fashion styles to play the classic style of Marilyn Monroe. Minnie wears a pink turtleneck suede dress from Vetements and a crystal necklace from Alessandra Rich to recreate Monroe's pink dress in the Gentlemen Prefer Blondes (1953). Song Yuqi replaced The Seven Year Itch (1955) classic white pleated skirt with what Katherine Ho described as the 'K-pop version' of the outfit—a Zimmermann white dress. The intention of their fashion choice for Song was to subvert the restrictive stereotype of the sexy Monroe by showing a youthful and energetic side. Soyeon's first look for "Nxde" featured a tapered top by Jean Paul Gaultier and Lotta Volkova, emphasizing the feminine aspect. The piece was a callback to the infamous cone bra that Gaultier also designed for Madonna's Blond Ambition World Tour (1990). In another scene, Soyeon depicts herself as a white sculpture—sporting platinum blonde hair fixed in a ponytail. She paired it with retro silhouette tailoring made by Korean designer Kowgi. Greek statue Shuhua wore a Retrofête metallic green evening dress, a reference to Monroe's green dress in the film River of No Return (1954). The concept of 'nude' was expressed by wearing a skin-toned top and maxi skirt.

Promotion
Prior to the release of I Love, on October 17, 2022, the group held a live event called "X-Love Show Private Premiere" to introduce the album and its songs, including "Nxde", with the attendance from the media press and 112 winners from the Makestar event. (G)I-dle promoted the song on various radio shows, including Naver Now, Miyeon's Gossip Idle, KBS Cool FM, Minhyuk's Kiss the Radio on October 19, and Youngjae's Got7 Youngjae's Best Friend. On October 19, they performed the song for the first time on M Countdown followed with a performance on Music Bank the next day. They appeared on Show! Music Core on the 22th and Inkigayo on the 23th. Later they appeared on The Show on October 25, followed by Music Bank and Show Champion on the afternoon of 26th and 28th.

Impact
The song's title, "Nxde", positively affected the search function of the social media portal. The word '(G)I-dle's nude' has occupied inappropriate keywords such as "child nude" and "girl nude". The name (G)I-dle '(여자)아이들' in Korean comes from girl '여자' and children '아이들'. Although the song is stylized as 'Nxde', it is still written out in Korean as '누드'. Thus, the inappropriate keywords were pushed down and replaced with '(G)I-dle Nxde' or '(G)I-dle nude' media articles, pictures, videos, stage photos, broadcast captures, album or song information, etc. Oh Myung-gi of Dispatch wrote in his article, "One's unembellished, the natural state was expressed using the word 'nude.' It shatters the R-rated images one associate with the word."

Accolades

Credits and personnel
Credits adapted from album liner notes, High Quality Fish and OH!ArtCrew.

Location
 Cube Studio – recording
 Ingrid Studio – digital editing
 Klang Studio – mixing
 Studio Shelter – animation

Song credits
 (G)I-dle – vocals
 Soyeon – background vocals, lyrics, composition, arrangement
 Pop Time – composition, arrangement
 Kako – background vocals, composition, arrangement
 Jenci – background vocals
 Kim Ho-hyun – guitar
 Park Ji-young – keyboard
 Choi Ye-ji – recording
 Jung Eun-kyung – digital editing
 Koo Jong-pil – mixing

Visual credits

 Moon Tae-eun – choreographer
 Kiel Tutin – choreographer
 Son Seung-hee  – music video director
 High Quality Fish – executive producer
 Jang Hong-suk, Kim Yong, Jin Young-hun, Lee Dong-hyun, Ahn Hyo-jun, and Park Kyeong-won – art team
 Yun Inmo  – director of photography
 Kim Woo-seok– digital imaging technicians
 Jimmy Motion production – jib
 Park Jun-hee – gaffer
 Jeon Seong-gang  – Stage lights
 Lee Jungae – art director
 Park Ji-won – 2D animation director
 Song Ji-yeon – senior animator
 Juan Ha, Lee Sung-hwan, Han Da-hye, Choi Hyeon-hye, Seon Ha-jin – animator
 Park Chou-young  – special effects
 Lee Ha-neul – project manager
 Kim Laon – producer

Charts

Weekly charts

Monthly charts

Year-end charts

Release history

See also
 List of Circle Digital Chart number ones of 2022
 List of K-pop songs on the Billboard charts
 List of K-pop songs on the World Digital Song Sales chart
 List of The Show Chart winners (2022)
 List of Show Champion Chart winners (2022)
 List of M Countdown Chart winners (2022)
 List of Music Bank Chart winners (2022)
 List of Show! Music Core Chart winners (2022)

Notes

References

External links
 
 
 

(G)I-dle songs
2022 singles
2022 songs
Cube Entertainment singles
Gaon Digital Chart number-one singles
Korean-language songs
Songs written by Jeon So-yeon
Jazz compositions in A minor
Cultural depictions of Marilyn Monroe